Yun County could refer to the following locations in China:

 Yun County, Hubei (郧县)
 Yun County, Yunnan (云县)